Zhao Xuebin (born 12 January 1993) is a Chinese professional footballer who currently plays for Cangzhou Mighty Lions in the Chinese Super League as a forward.

Club career
Zhao started his professional football career in 2011 when he was promoted to Chinese Super League side Dalian Shide. On 8 May 2011, he made his senior debut for Dalian in a 3–0 away defeat against Liaoning Whowin, coming on as a substitute for Lü Peng in the 69th minute. On 21 May 2011, he scored his first goal in the 89th minute, just three minutes after his substitute on, which ensured Dalian beat Henan Jianye 1–0.

In 2013, Zhao transferred to Dalian Aerbin (now known as Dalian Professional) after Dalian Shide dissolved.

Career statistics
Statistics accurate as of match played 31 December 2020.

Honours

Club
Dalian Professional
China League One: 2017

References

External links
 
Player profile at Sodasoccer.com

1993 births
Living people
Chinese footballers
Footballers from Dalian
Dalian Shide F.C. players
Dalian Professional F.C. players
Chinese Super League players
China League One players
Association football forwards